Larry D. Thomas (born 1947) is an American poet. He was the 2008 Texas Poet Laureate, and in 2009 was inducted into the Texas Institute of Letters.

Early life and education 
Thomas was born in Haskell, Texas in 1947. He attended the University of Houston, where he earned a Bachelor's in English in 1970.

Career

Early career 
While earning his degree Thomas worked as a social services caseworker. He was drafted into the Navy after graduation. His orders had placed him in Norfolk, Virginia, where he worked as a prison counselor for the naval base. Thomas continued to work in the prison system after his discharge, working in the adult probation field in Houston, Texas.

Writing career 
Thomas began writing while he was in the service and continued writing after he retired in 1998. His first collection of poetry, The Lighthouse Keeper, was published in January 2001 through Timberline Press. That same year he published Amazing Grace through the Texas Review Press. The collection won several prizes, which included the 2003 Western Heritage Wrangler Award. Thomas would receive the award a second time in 2015 for The Goatherd and has since won other awards.

In April 2007 Thomas was appointed by the Texas Legislature as the 2008 Texas Poet Laureate and in 2009, was inducted into the Texas Institute of Letters.

Awards
 2001: Texas Review Poetry Prize
 2003 and 2015: Western Heritage Wrangler Award
 2004: Texas Review Poetry Prize (for Where Skulls Speak Wind)
 2004: Violet Crown Book Award
 2008: Texas Poet Laureate (appointed in 2007)
 2009: Texas Institute of Letters

Bibliography
 2001: The Lighthouse Keeper (poetry chapbook), Timberline Press
 2001: Amazing Grace (poems), Texas Review Press
 2002: The Woodlanders (poetry chapbook), Pecan Grove Press
 2004: Where Skulls Speak Wind (poems), Texas Review Press
 2005: Stark Beauty (poems), Timberline Press
 2007: With the Light of Apricots (poetry chapbook), Lily Press 
 2007: Eros (poetry chapbook), Slow Trains Literary Journal 
 2008: The Fraternity of Oblivion (poems), Timberline Press
 2008: Larry D. Thomas: TCU Texas Poet Laureate Series (poems), TCU Press
 2008: The Circus (poetry chapbook), Right Hand Pointing 
 2009: Plain Pine (poetry chapbook), Right Hand Pointing 
 2010: The Skin of Light (poems), Dalton Publishing
 2010: Dark Pearls (poetry chapbook), LaNana Creek Press (Stephen F. Austin State University)
 2010: Wolves (poetry chapbook), El Grito del Lobo Press (Fulton, MO)
 2010: Five Lavender Minutes of an Afternoon (poetry chapbook), Right Hand Pointing
 2011: A Murder of Crows (poems), Virtual Artists Collective
 2011: The Red, Candle-lit Darkness (poetry chapbook), El Grito del Lobo Press (Fulton, MO)
 2011: Far (West Texas) (poetry chapbook), Right Hand Pointing 
 2012: Social Networks (poetry chapbook), Right Hand Pointing 
 2013: Uncle Ernest (poems), Virtual Artists Collective
 2013: Colors (poetry chapbook), Right Hand Pointing
 2014: The Lobsterman's Dream: (Poems of the Coast of Maine), El Grito del Lobo Press (Fulton, MO)
 2014: The Goatherd (poetry chapbook), Mouthfeel Press (El Paso, TX)
 2014: Art Museums (poetry chapbook), Blue Horse Press (Los Angeles, CA)
 2014: The Wadded Up Poem Behind the Dumpster (poetry chapbook), Right Hand Pointing
 2015: As If Light Actually Matters: New & Selected Poems, (Texas Review Press)
 2015: Los Dias de los Muertos (poetry chapbook), Right Hand Pointing
 2015: Goodbye Mexico: Poems of Remembrance (contributor), Texas Review Press
 2016: The Circus (poetry chapbook, revised print edition), Blue Horse Press (Los Angeles, CA)
 2016: Jake & Violet (poetry chapbook), Right Hand Pointing
 2016: El Padre (poetry chapbook), nodding onion (Virtual Artists Collective, Chicago)
 2016: Bleak Music: Photographs and Poems of the American Southwest, Blue Horse Press (Los Angeles, CA)
 2016: Placido (poetry chapbook), nodding onion (Virtual Artists Collective, Chicago)
 2017: Pecos (poetry chapbook), Right Hand Pointing
 2017: "The Emperor of Ice-Cream" (poetry chapbook), Right Hand Pointing
 2018: Luz: a demanding, elusive, and indomitable muse (poetry chapbook), Right Hand Pointing
 2018: The Innkeeper (poetry chapbook), Mouthfeel Press (El Paso, TX)
 2019: Boiling It Down: The Electronic Poetry Chapbooks of Larry D. Thomas, Blue Horse Press (Redondo Beach, CA)
 2019: Ten Ways of Looking at an Earthworm (poetry chapbook), Right Hand Pointing
 2019: In a Field of Cotton: Mississippi River Delta Poems, Blue Horse Press (Redondo Beach, CA)
 2020: Journeying with the Owl, (poetry chapbook) Right Hand Pointing

Further reading

References

External links
 
 Larry D. Thomas Collection at the East Texas Research Center

American male poets
Poets from Texas
1947 births
Living people
People from Haskell, Texas
Howard Payne University alumni
University of Houston alumni
Poets Laureate of Texas
Chapbook writers